The Voyages extraordinaires is a collection or sequence of novels and short stories by the French writer Jules Verne. 

Fifty-four of these novels were originally published between 1863 and 1905, during the author's lifetime, and eight additional novels were published posthumously. The posthumous novels were published under Jules Verne's name, but had been extensively altered or, in one case, completely written by his son Michel Verne.

According to Verne's editor Pierre-Jules Hetzel, the goal of the Voyages was "to outline all the geographical, geological, physical, historical and astronomical knowledge amassed by modern science and to recount, in an entertaining and picturesque format ... the history of the universe."

Verne's meticulous attention to detail and scientific trivia, coupled with his sense of wonder and exploration, form the backbone of the Voyages. Part of the reason for the broad appeal of his work was the sense that the reader could really learn knowledge of geology, biology, astronomy, paleontology, oceanography, history and the exotic locations and cultures of the world through the adventures of Verne's protagonists. This great wealth of information distinguished his works as "encyclopedic novels".

The first of Verne's novels to carry the title Voyages Extraordinaires was The Adventures of Captain Hatteras, which was the third of all his novels.

The works in this series are adventure stories, some with overt science fiction elements (e.g., Journey to the Center of the Earth) or elements of scientific romance (e.g., Twenty Thousand Leagues Under the Sea).

Theme
In a late interview, Verne affirmed that Hetzel's ambitious commission had become the running literary theme of his novel sequence:

However, Verne made clear that his own object was more literary than scientific, saying "I do not in any way pose as a scientist" and explaining in another interview:

Publication
In the system developed by Hetzel for the Voyages Extraordinaires, each of Verne's novels was published successively in several different formats. This resulted in as many as four distinct editions of each text (labeled here according to current practice for Verne bibliographies): 
 Éditions pré-originales (pre-original editions): Serialization in a periodical, usually Hetzel's own biweekly Magasin d'Éducation et de récréation ("Magazine of Education and Recreation", founded 1864). The serialized installments were illustrated by artists on Hetzel's staff, such as Édouard Riou, Léon Benett, and George Roux.
 Éditions originales (original editions): complete unillustrated texts published in book form at 18mo size. (Similar versions in the slightly larger 12mo size, with illustrations taken from the serialization, are also considered éditions originales.)
 Cartonnages dorés et colorés (gilded and colored bindings): Complete editions of the text, published in grand in-8º ("large octavo") book form with a lavishly decorated cover. These deluxe editions, designed for Christmas and New Year's markets, include most or all of the illustrations from the serializations.

Continued appeal
Jules Verne remains to this day the most translated science fiction author in the world as well as one of the most continually reprinted and widely read French authors. Though often scientifically outdated, his Voyages still retain their sense of wonder that appealed to readers of his time, and still provoke an interest in the sciences among the young.

The Voyages are frequently adapted into film, from Georges Méliès' fanciful 1902 film Le Voyage dans la Lune (aka A Trip to the Moon), to Walt Disney's 1954 adaptation of Twenty Thousand Leagues Under the Sea, to the 2004 version of Around the World in 80 Days starring Jackie Chan. Their spirit has also continued to influence fiction to this day, including James Gurney's Dinotopia series and "softening" Steampunk's dystopianism with utopian wonder and curiosity.

List of novels
Most of the novels in the Voyages series (except for Five Weeks in a Balloon, Journey to the Center of the Earth, and  The Purchase of the North Pole) were first serialized in periodicals, usually in Hetzel's Magasin d'Éducation et de récréation ("Magazine of Education and Recreation"). Almost all of the original book editions were published by Pierre-Jules Hetzel in octodecimo format, often in several volumes. (The one exception is Claudius Bombarnac, which was first published in a grand-in-8º edition.)

What follows are the fifty-four novels published in Verne's lifetime, with the most common English-language title for each novel. The dates given are those of the first publication in book form.

 Cinq semaines en ballon (Five Weeks in a Balloon, 1863)
 Voyages et aventures du capitaine Hatteras (The Adventures of Captain Hatteras, 1866)
 Voyage au centre de la Terre (Journey to the Center of the Earth,  1864, revised 1867)
 De la terre à la lune (From the Earth to the Moon, 1865)
 Les Enfants du capitaine Grant (In Search of the Castaways, 1867–68)
 Vingt mille lieues sous les mers (Twenty Thousand Leagues under the Seas, 1869–70)
 Autour de la lune (Around The Moon, 1870)
 Une ville flottante (A Floating City, 1871)
 Aventures de trois Russes et de trois Anglais (The Adventures of Three Englishmen and Three Russians in South Africa, 1872)
 Le Pays des fourrures (The Fur Country, 1873)
 Le Tour du monde en quatre-vingts jours (Around the World in Eighty Days, 1873)
 L'Île mystérieuse (The Mysterious Island, 1874–75)
 Le Chancellor (The Survivors of the Chancellor, 1875)
 Michel Strogoff (Michael Strogoff, 1876)
 Hector Servadac (Off on a Comet, 1877)
 Les Indes noires (The Child of the Cavern, 1877)
 Un capitaine de quinze ans (Dick Sand, A Captain at Fifteen, 1878)
 Les Cinq Cents Millions de la Bégum (The Begum's Millions, 1879)
 Les Tribulations d'un chinois en Chine (Tribulations of a Chinaman in China, 1879)
 La Maison à vapeur (The Steam House, 1880)
 La Jangada (Eight Hundred Leagues on the Amazon, 1881)
 L'École des Robinsons (Godfrey Morgan, 1882)
 Le Rayon vert (The Green Ray, 1882)
 Kéraban-le-têtu (Kéraban the Inflexible, 1883)
 L'Étoile du sud (The Vanished Diamond, 1884)
 L'Archipel en feu (The Archipelago on Fire, 1884)
 Mathias Sandorf (Mathias Sandorf, 1885)
 Un billet de loterie (The Lottery Ticket, 1886)
 Robur-le-Conquérant (Robur the Conqueror, 1886)
 Nord contre Sud (North Against South, 1887)
 Le Chemin de France (The Flight to France, 1887)
 Deux Ans de vacances (Two Years' Vacation, 1888)
 Famille-sans-nom (Family Without a Name, 1889)
 Sans dessus dessous (The Purchase of the North Pole, 1889)
 César Cascabel (César Cascabel, 1890)
 Mistress Branican (Mistress Branican, 1891)
 Le Château des Carpathes (Carpathian Castle, 1892)
 Claudius Bombarnac (Claudius Bombarnac, 1892)
 P’tit-Bonhomme (Foundling Mick, 1893)
 Mirifiques Aventures de Maître Antifer (Captain Antifer, 1894)
 L'Île à hélice (Propeller Island, 1895)
 Face au drapeau (Facing the Flag, 1896)
 Clovis Dardentor (Clovis Dardentor, 1896)
 Le Sphinx des glaces (An Antarctic Mystery, 1897)
 Le Superbe Orénoque (The Mighty Orinoco, 1898)
 Le Testament d'un excentrique (The Will of an Eccentric, 1899)
 Seconde Patrie (The Castaways of the Flag, 1900)
 Le Village aérien (The Village in the Treetops, 1901)
 Les Histoires de Jean-Marie Cabidoulin (The Sea Serpent, 1901)
 Les Frères Kip (The Kip Brothers, 1902)
 Bourses de voyage (Travel Scholarships, 1903)
 Un drame en Livonie (A Drama in Livonia, 1904)
 Maître du monde (Master of the World, 1904)
 L'Invasion de la mer (Invasion of the Sea, 1905)

The posthumous additions to the series, extensively altered and in one case (The Thompson Travel Agency) entirely written by Verne's son Michel, are as follows.

 Le Phare du bout du monde (Lighthouse at the End of the World, 1905)
 Le Volcan d’or (The Golden Volcano, 1906)
 L’Agence Thompson and Co (The Thompson Travel Agency, 1907)
 La Chasse au météore (The Chase of the Golden Meteor, 1908)
 Le Pilote du Danube (The Danube Pilot, 1908)
 Les Naufragés du "Jonathan" (The Survivors of the "Jonathan", 1909)
 Le Secret de Wilhelm Storitz (The Secret of Wilhelm Storitz, 1910)
 L’Étonnante Aventure de la mission Barsac (The Barsac Mission, 1919)

Short stories
The Voyages series includes two short story collections and seven individual short stories that accompanied one of the novels in the series.

The short story collections are:
 Le Docteur Ox (Doctor Ox, 1874)
 Hier et Demain (Yesterday and Tomorrow, 1910) (posthumous, with stories completed or modified by Michel Verne)

And the individual short stories:
 Les Forceurs de blocus (The Blockade Runners, published with A Floating City, 1871)
 Martin Paz (Martin Paz, published with The Survivors of the Chancellor, 1875)
 Un drame au Mexique (A Drama in Mexico, published with Michael Strogoff, 1876)
 Les révoltés de la Bounty (The Mutineers of the Bounty, published with The Begum's Millions, 1879)
 Dix heures en chasse (Ten Hours Hunting, published with The Green Ray, 1882)
 Frritt-Flacc (Frritt-Flacc, published with The Lottery Ticket, 1886)
 Gil Braltar (Gil Braltar, published with The Flight to France, 1887)

Classification
In promotional materials for the series, Verne's editor Pierre-Jules Hetzel classified the Voyages Extraordinaires in several groups, mostly following geographic criteria:
 The Robinsons Cycle: Godfrey Morgan, Two Years' Vacation, The Castaways of the Flag, The Survivors of the "Jonathan"
 Europe: Journey to the Center of the Earth, The Child of the Cavern, The Green Ray, The Archipelago on Fire, The Lottery Ticket, The Flight to France, Carpathian Castle, Foundling Mick, A Drama in Livonia, The Danube Pilot, The Secret of Wilhelm Storitz
 Africa: Five Weeks in a Balloon, The Adventures of Three Englishmen and Three Russians in South Africa, Dick Sand, A Captain at Fifteen, The Vanished Diamond, Clovis Dardentor, The Village in the Treetops, Invasion of the Sea, The Thompson Travel Agency, The Barsac Mission
 The Polar Lands: The Adventures of Captain Hatteras, The Fur Country, An Antarctic Mystery 
 World Tours: In Search of the Castaways, Twenty Thousand Leagues under the Seas, Around the World in Eighty Days, Robur the Conqueror, Captain Antifer
 The Two Americas: The Begum's Millions, Eight Hundred Leagues on the Amazon, North Against South, Family Without a Name, César Cascabel, Facing the Flag, The Mighty Orinoco, The Will of an Eccentric, Travel Scholarships, Master of the World, The Golden Volcano
 Asia: Michael Strogoff, Tribulations of a Chinaman in China, The Steam House, Claudius Bombarnac
 Seas and Oceans: A Floating City, The Mysterious Island, The Survivors of the Chancellor, Kéraban the Inflexible, Mathias Sandorf, The Sea Serpent, Lighthouse at the End of the World
 Celestial Spaces: From the Earth to the Moon, Around The Moon, Off on a Comet, The Purchase of the North Pole, The Chase of the Golden Meteor
 Oceania and Australia: Mistress Branican, Propeller Island, The Kip Brothers
 Tales and News: Doctor Ox, Yesterday and Tomorrow

See also

Scientific romance
Edisonade
Steampunk
Adventure fiction

References

External links
'Zvi Har’El’s Jules Verne Collection' 
 The maps from the Voyages Extraordinaires, scans of all the maps that were included in the original editions of Jules Verne's novels.

Novels by Jules Verne
Novel series
Editorial collections
Nautical novels
Steampunk
Science fiction
Steampunk novels
French science fiction